Orthetrum triangulare is an Asian freshwater dragonfly species. The common name for this species is blue-tailed forest hawk.  Two subspecies of Orthetrum triangulare are currently recognised, the nominate subspecies and O. t. malaccense.

Description and habitat
It is a medium-sized dragonfly with dark face and bluish eyes. Its thorax is also black with a broad apple green stripe on both sides. Segments 1-2 and 8–10 in the abdomen are black and the remaining segments are pruinosed with azure blue. It is usually found in marshes associated with hill streams where it breeds.

See also 
 List of odonates of Sri Lanka
 List of odonates of India
 List of odonata of Kerala

References

External links 

Insects described in 1878
Insects of Asia
Libellulidae